The 1935–36 Georgetown Hoyas men's basketball team represented Georgetown University during the 1935–36 NCAA college basketball season. Fred Mesmer coached it in his fifth season as head coach. The team was a member of the Eastern Intercollegiate Conference (EIC) and played its home games at Tech Gymnasium on the campus of McKinley Technical High School in Washington, D.C. The team finished with a record of 7-11 overall, 4-6 in the EIC.

Season recap

Sophomore forward Mike Petrosky joined the team this season. Tall for the era at 6-feet-4 (193 cm), he was pressed into service as the teams center, and performed well in this role on both defense and offense, averaging 5.5 points per game for the year. On January 16, 1936, he scored the winning basket in the final minute of overtime in Georgetowns 43-42 win over Pittsburgh and on defense prevented the Panthers from scoring to win in the final seconds. On February 7, 1936, he matched up successfully on defense against New York Universitys All-American center Mort "King Kong" Klein as the Hoyas upset formerly top-ranked NYU 36-34.

Sophomore forward Harry Bassin was another newcomer to the team. He quickly became its leader, scoring in every game and finishing with a team-high average of 9.0 points per game. He scored a team-high 11 points in the upset of NYU.

Roster
Sources

Sophomore guard Tom Nolan would go on to serve as Georgetowns head basketball coach from 1956 to 1960, and as the schools baseball coach until the end of the 1978 season.

1935–36 schedule and results
Sources

|-
!colspan=9 style="background:#002147; color:#8D817B;"| Regular Season

References

Georgetown Hoyas men's basketball seasons
Georgetown Hoyas
Georgetown Hoyas men's basketball team
Georgetown Hoyas men's basketball team